Going home in the rain is a collection of short stories in English by Indian writer Monideepa Sahu. The book was released on 22 May 2016 in Bhubaneswar.

The book is a collection of fourteen stories  of various lengths. The stories have been described as, “Everyday situations and people reveal extraordinary facets.” In an interview with The New Indian Express the author mentions "Loneliness of life in big cities; horrors of war; love, loss, longing and hope; artistic integrity versus commercial success are some of the varying themes in the stories." The aim of the author in these stories was to reveal numerous perspectives of human life through short stories.

See also
Riddle of the Seventh Stone, a 2010 novel by Monideepa Sahoo

References

2016 short story collections
Indian literature in English
Indian short stories